The North Carolina A&T–South Carolina State football rivalry is an American college football rivalry game played annually by the Aggies of North Carolina Agricultural and Technical State University and the Bulldogs of South Carolina State University. The series dates back to 1924 and is driven by the proximity of the two schools, as both are within The Carolinas; and conference alignments.

Both schools are members of the NCAA Division I Mid-Eastern Athletic Conference (MEAC) and are the largest public Historically Black colleges representing their respective states. In addition to each team's respective home fields in Greensboro, North Carolina and Orangeburg, South Carolina, the annual match up between the two Southeastern state schools has been held in cities such as Charlotte and Atlanta, as various classics. A pivotal moment in this rivalry was when South Carolina State spoiled the North Carolina A&T's 2003 undefeated conference record when they handed the Aggies their only MEAC loss of the season with a 49–9 win in the regular season closer. Currently, South Carolina State leads the series 33 to 24, with 2 ties.

Series history

The North Carolina A&T and South Carolina State have been continuously competing against each other since 1958. In the most recent contest, North Carolina A&T defeated the Bulldogs by a score of 30-20 in Aggie Stadium (North Carolina A&T). The two schools have played 53 times since their first meeting, with South Carolina State leading the series with a record of 32 wins 22 losses and 2 ties.

In the early years of the series, the match up between North Carolina A&T and South Carolina State was an inter-conference contest; as A&T was a member of the NCAA Division II Central Intercollegiate Athletic Conference (CIAA) and SC State was a member of the Southern Intercollegiate Athletic Conference (SIAC). In 1969, A&T and SCSU; along with five other institutions, formed the MEAC. As a result of the newly formed conference, the series between the two schools now had conference implications. From 1952 to 1973, A&T dominated the series as the Aggies maintained a 7–0 winning streak. in 1974, under the leadership of head coach Willie E. Jeffries, South Carolina State would earn their first victory of the series. That season, the bulldogs would go on to claim the MEAC championship.

South Carolina State would maintain their dominance for the remainder of the 1970, winning 5 MEAC football titles in the decade. In 1976, A&T spoiled South Carolina State's chances at a perfect season. In their 1976 meeting, the Aggies handed the Bulldogs their lone defeat with a closely contested 15–14 victory in Greensboro, NC. Although suffering a loss to the rival Aggies, South Carolina State would go on to win the MEAC title and be crowned the Black College Football National Champions. From 1977 to 1985, the South Carolina State would go on a 9-game winning streak, bringing the series record to a tie in 1982.

In 1995, the annual competition moved from the two respective campuses to Charlotte, North Carolina, where it became known as the Carolinas Classic. During the classic's run, South Carolina State would win the first three contests, while the A&T would win the latter half. In 2002, the contest was moved to Atlanta's Georgia Dome and billed as the Peach State Classic. South Carolina State would win the game 26–9, increasing their command over the series to 21–13. The following year, the annual game would return to Charlotte. In 2003, South Carolina State spoiled the MEAC champion Aggies undefeated conference record when they handed A&T their only MEAC loss of the season with a 49–9 win in the regular season closer. Following the classics' run in Charlotte, the game was moved back to the team's respective home fields. In 2013, South Carolina State reached an agreement with the 100 Black Men of Atlanta to hold the annual meeting with A&T in Atlanta. The game marked the first time that two teams from the same conference would compete in the Atlanta Football Classic. In this meeting, South Carolina State would defeat the previously unbeaten North Carolina A&T Aggies 29–24. The following year, the game returned to Atlanta where the Bulldogs would once again defeat the Aggies 13–0. The 2015 matchup in Orangeburg, SC resulted in the Aggies defeating the Bulldogs by a score of 9-6.

Game results

See also  
 List of NCAA college football rivalry games

References

College football rivalries in the United States
North Carolina A&T Aggies football
South Carolina State Bulldogs football